Allocota aurata is a species of either blackish-green or brownish-green coloured ground beetle in the Lebiinae subfamily that can be found in such Asian countries as China, Japan, Laos, Nepal, Taiwan (Formosa) and Viet Nam.

References

Beetles described in 1873
Beetles of Asia